Henri-Marie-Gaston Boisnormand de Bonnechose (30 May 1800 – 28 October 1883) was a French Catholic and senator. He was the last surviving cardinal to have been born in the 18th century.

Biography
Bonnechose was born in Paris.  Entering the magistracy, he became attorney-general for the district of Besançon in 1830, but having received holy orders at Strasburg, under the episcopate of Jean François Marie Lepappe de Trevern, he was made professor of sacred eloquence in the school of higher studies founded at Besançon by Cardinal de Rohan.

After the death of de Rohan, he went to Rome to settle the differences between Bishop de Trevern and himself, due to philosophical opinions found in his work, "Philosophy of Christianity", for which Bonnechose had written an introduction. In 1844 he was named by Rome superior of the community of St. Louis. In 1847 he became Bishop of Carcassonne. He was transferred on 4 November 1854 to the see of Évreux and in 1854 raised to the archiepiscopal see of Rouen.

Created cardinal in 1863, he became ex-officio senator of the empire. The cardinal showed himself a warm advocate of the temporal power of the popes, and firmly protested against the withdrawal of the French army from the Pontifical States.

In 1870, he went to Versailles, the headquarters of the German armies, to entreat Wilhelm I of Prussia to reduce the war contribution imposed on the city of Rouen. Under the republican government he uniformly opposed the laws and measures passed against religious congregations and their schools, but endeavored to inspire his clergy to deference and conciliation in their relations with the civil authorities.

His best known work is "Introduction a la philosophie du Christianisme" (1835), two octavo volumes.

See also

 List of works by Henri Chapu

References
Guerin, Dict. des dict. (Paris, 1892)
Larousse, Dict. Univ. du XlX siecle (Paris 1867)

Notes

1800 births
1883 deaths
19th-century French cardinals
Cardinals created by Pope Pius IX
Bishops of Carcassonne
Archbishops of Rouen
Bishops of Évreux